Yousaf is an alternative name of Joseph in Islam. For a Muslim view of Joseph, see Joseph in Islam.

Yousaf is also a given name and surname and an alternative of Joseph, Yousef, Yusuf, Yousuf and variants. Famous people with the name include:

Given name
Yousaf Ali Khan, British film director
Yousaf Aziz Magsi (1908-1935), Baloch leader from the present-day Balochistan province of Pakistan
Yousaf Borahil Al-Msmare (ca. 1866-1931), Libyan Muslim resistance leader fighting against Italian colonization

Surname
Bilal Yousaf (born 1928), Persian writer
Humza Yousaf (born 1985), Scottish politician of Pakistani origin. Member of the Scottish Parliament (MSP) and a Scottish government minister
Jam Mohammad Yousaf (1954–2013), the 12th Jam of Lasbela, former Chief Minister of Balochistan province of Pakistan
Kyle Yousaf (born 1993), British boxer
The Yousaf Sisters, American music duo which make up Krewella:
Jahan Yousaf
Yasmine Yousaf

Others
"Yousaf" (The Americans), the tenth episode of the second season of the American television drama series The Americans, and the 23rd overall episode of the series.